Wilhelm Kreis (17 March 1873 – 13 August 1955) was a prominent German architect and professor of architecture, active through four political systems in German history: the Wilhelmine era, the Weimar Republic, the Third Reich, and the foundation of the Federal Republic.  

Kreis was born in Eltville am Rhein in Hesse-Nassau. He first came to prominence with his 1896 submission for the Völkerschlachtdenkmal in Leipzig, although the commission went to Bruno Schmitz.  Around the turn of the century, Kreis designed 58 of the Bismarck Towers, a number of civic projects in Dresden, the 1924 William Marx house, and other significant projects.  The 1926 Rheinhalle (today:Tonhalle Düsseldorf) in Düsseldorf was his first major cultural project, followed by the German Hygiene Museum in Dresden.  As opposed to the modernist movement then emerging, Kreis was among those architects like Heinrich Tessenow and Paul Bonatz who continued to work in a historical, conservative style.

Kreis was dismissed from the presidency of the League of German Architects (BDA) in 1933 and he saw his commissions dry up as a result.  But within two years he was again working, under the direction of Albert Speer, for war projects in Dresden and the gigantic plans for Berlin, notably the design for the massive Soldiers Hall.  Employing the respected Kreis brought Speer some legitimacy; Kreis responded by becoming an active supporter of National Socialism.  He was named as one of the Reich's most important artists in the Gottbegnadeten list of September 1944.  

In the postwar period, Kreis continued to receive commissions despite his advanced age.

Further reading 
George L. Mosse, The Nationalization of the Masses: Political Symbolism and Mass Movements in Germany from the Napoleonic Wars through the Third Reich (New York: Howard Fertig, 1975).

References

External links 
 Kreis biography (in German)

1873 births
1955 deaths
20th-century German architects
Architects in the Nazi Party
People from Hesse-Nassau
Commanders Crosses of the Order of Merit of the Federal Republic of Germany